Cosentini Associates is an engineering firm that provides consulting engineering services for the building industry.

Company history 

Cosentini Associates was founded in 1952 by William Randolph Cosentini as W.R. Cosentini and Associates. William Cosentini was the second born child of Italian immigrant parents Eugenio and Vincenza Cosentini. He earned his MA in mechanical engineering from New York University. Two years after founding the company, William Cosentini died in 1954 at 41 years of age.

The company was established to provide consulting services in the mechanical and electrical engineering disciplines. What started out as a six-person firm has grown to employ more than 300 workers. The company is headquartered at 498 Seventh Avenue in New York City. The firm also has offices in other US cities including Boston, Chicago, Philadelphia and Houston.

Project types include corporate headquarters, high-rise commercial office buildings, tenant interiors, libraries, academic facilities, museums and performing arts centers, government office buildings, command and control facilities, hotels, residential towers, large-scale mixed- use developments, healthcare and R&D facilities, courthouses, and mission-critical facilities.

In 1999, Cosentini greatly expanded its engineering and design resources by joining Tetra Tech, Inc., a nationwide alliance offering consulting, engineering, and technical services. With nearly 20,000 associates in 400 offices around the world, the company supports commercial and government clients in engineering design, resource management and infrastructure, telecommunications support services, applied science, management consulting, and construction management.

Notable projects

1950s 

 SUNY Albany's Uptown Campus, Edward Durell Stone 
 Time-Life Building (Chicago), Wallace Harrison of Harrison, Abramovitz, and Harris

1960s 

 Huntington Hartford Museum, Edward Durell Stone
 Ford Foundation Building, Kevin Roche and John Dinkeloo of KRJDA 
 Habitat 67, Moshe Safdie
 IBM Pavilion, 1964-1965 New York World's Fair, Eero Saarinen
 Israel Museum, Alfred Mansfeld, Armand Bartos, and Frederick Kiesler
 New England Aquarium, Peter Chermayeff of Cambridge Seven Associates

1970s 

 Field Museum of Natural History restoration, Harry Weese
 Grand 1894 Opera House renovation, Hardy Holzman Pfeiffer
 IDS Center, Philip Johnson 
 John F. Kennedy Presidential Library and Museum, I. M. Pei
 John Hancock Tower, Henry N. Cobb of I. M. Pei & Partners 
 Solar One, Mária Telkes
 Solow Building, Gordon Bunshaft of Skidmore, Owings & Merrill 
 Washington Metro, Harry Weese

1980s 

 499 Park Avenue, James Ingo Freed of I. M. Pei & Partners 
 Carnegie Hall Tower, César Pelli 
 Crystal Cathedral, Philip Johnson 
 Lipstick Building, Philip Johnson
 AT&T Building, Philip Johnson
 United Airlines Terminal at O'Hare International Airport, Helmut Jahn of Murphy/Jahn Architects

1990s 

 4 Times Square, Bruce Fowle of Fox & Fowle 
 Capella Tower, James Ingo Freed of Pei Cobb Freed & Partners 
 Daniel Patrick Moynihan United States Courthouse, KPF
 Disney Animation Building, Robert A. M. Stern
 Guggenheim Museum Bilbao, Frank Gehry 
 Rodin Pavilion, KPF 
 United States Holocaust Memorial Museum, James Ingo Freed of Pei Cobb Freed & Partners, with Finegold Alexander + Associates Inc

2000s 

 First World Towers, KPF
 IAC Building, Frank Gehry
 Linked Hybrid, Steven Holl
 National Museum of the American Indian, Douglas Cardinal, Johnpaul Jones, and GBQC Architects
 Newman Vertical Campus at Baruch College, KPF 
 Lewis Science Library at Princeton University, Frank Gehry
 Richard B. Fisher Center for the Performing Arts at Bard College, Frank Gehry 
 Time Warner Center, David Childs of Skidmore, Owings & Merrill
 Walt Disney Concert Hall, Frank Gehry

2010s 

 11 Times Square, Bruce Fowle of FXFOWLE
 Millennium Place, Handel Architects 
 New World Center, Frank Gehry
 Shanghai Tower, Gensler

Un-built 

 Atlanta Symphony Center, Santiago Calatrava
 Chicago Spire, Santiago Calatrava

References

External links
 
 List of projects at The Skyscraper Center, Council on Tall Buildings and Urban Habitat

Engineering companies of the United States
Engineering consulting firms of the United States
Companies based in Manhattan
Design companies established in 1952
1952 establishments in New York City